The Brackenridge Field Laboratory (BFL) is an urban research station owned by the University of Texas at Austin. Established officially in 1967, it contains 82 acres of land and research infrastructure. It is dedicated to studies in biology. The extensive historical data kept about its diverse habitats has been important to the study of biodiversity, ecological succession and ecology. Some of the key studies into the red imported fire ant (Solenopsis invicta) and potential biocontrol agents such as phorid flies have originated at the field station. It also contains the second largest insect collection in Texas. Since 1973 the Brackenridge Field Laboratory has been a subject of controversy due to the high value of the land.

In 1910, George Washington Brackenridge donated  located on the Colorado River to the university.

A satellite field station in Bastrop County (Stengl Lost Pines Biological Station) is also available for biological research and teaching.

References

Laboratories in the United States
Biological stations